Silke Pielen (born 29 August 1955 in Nordhorn) is a German former swimmer who competed in the 1972 Summer Olympics.

References

1955 births
Living people
German female swimmers
Female backstroke swimmers
Olympic swimmers of West Germany
Swimmers at the 1972 Summer Olympics
Olympic bronze medalists for West Germany
Olympic bronze medalists in swimming
Medalists at the 1972 Summer Olympics
People from Nordhorn
Sportspeople from Lower Saxony
20th-century German women